The Amani National Congress (ANC) is a social-liberal political party in Kenya.

History
The party was established by Musalia Mudavadi in 2015 after he left the United Democratic Forum Party, with around 300 UDF members from Nairobi joining the new party.

Prior to the 2017 general elections Mudavadi formed the National Super Alliance, which supported  Raila Odinga as its presidential candidate. The parties contested the parliamentary elections alone, with the ANC becoming the fourth largest in Parliament, winning three seats in the Senate and fourteen in the National Assembly.

References

External links
Official website

2015 establishments in Kenya
Liberal parties in Kenya
Political parties established in 2015
Political parties in Kenya
Social liberal parties